The 1970 U.S. Women's Open was the 25th U.S. Women's Open, held July 2–5 at Muskogee Country Club in Muskogee, Oklahoma.

Defending champion Donna Caponi won the second of her four major titles, one stroke ahead of runners-up Sandra Haynie and Sandra Spuzich. Caponi's four-foot (1.3 m) putt for a double bogey on the final hole hung on the lip before falling to avoid a Monday playoff. She was the second of seven to successfully defend the championship, following Mickey Wright in 1959. Caponi entered the final round with a four-stroke lead and shot a 77 (+6).

Past champions in the field

Source:

Final leaderboard
Sunday, July 5, 1970

Source:

References

External links
Golf Observer final leaderboard
U.S. Women's Open – past champions – 1970
Muskogee Country Club

U.S. Women's Open
Golf in Oklahoma
Sports competitions in Oklahoma
Muskogee, Oklahoma
Women's sports in Oklahoma
U.S. Women's Open
U.S. Women's Open
U.S. Women's Open
U.S. Women's Open